Strusiv is a small village located in Ternopil Raion of Ternopil Oblast in western Ukraine.

History
Strusiv was founded in 1434. In the first half of In the 17th century, the village was owned by the Strus family of the Korczak coat of arms, including Mikołaj Struś, commander of the Polish troops in the Moscow Kremlin.

During the Second Republic of Poland, Strusiv was the seat of the rural commune of Strusów in the Trembowelski poviat in the Tarnopol Voivodeship. In 1921, it had 2,412 inhabitants.

In the village there is a monument to Stepan Bandera, built in 2009 at the initiative of Ukrainian local authorities.

Until 18 July 2020, Strusiv belonged to Terebovlia Raion. The raion was abolished in July 2020 as part of the administrative reform of Ukraine, which reduced the number of raions of Ternopil Oblast to three. The area of Terebovlia Raion was merged into Ternopil Raion.

References

External links

Villages in Ternopil Raion